The Blackstone River is a river in the U.S. states of Massachusetts and Rhode Island. It flows approximately 48 mi (80 km) and drains a watershed of approximately 540 sq. mi (1,400 km2). Its long history of industrial use has left a legacy of pollution, and it was characterized by the United States Environmental Protection Agency in 1990 as "the most polluted river in the country with respect to toxic sediments."

History
The river is named after William Blackstone (original spelling William Blaxton) who arrived in Weymouth, Massachusetts in 1623, and became the first European settler of present-day Boston in 1625.  He relocated again, to Rhode Island in 1635 and built his home on the river, in what would become Cumberland.  With the Providence River, the Blackstone was the northeastern border of Dutch claims for New Netherland from Adriaen Block's charting of Narragansett Bay in 1614 through the Hartford Treaty of 1650.

The original Native American name for the river was the "Kittacuck", which meant "the great tidal river". The "Kittacuck", or Blackstone, was plentiful with salmon and lamprey in pre-colonial and colonial times.

In 1790, Samuel Slater opened the first successful water powered cotton mill in America, Slater Mill, at Pawtucket Falls.  This mill was powered by the waters of the Blackstone River. Many other mills appeared along the Blackstone River over time making it an important part of American industry. The industrialization also led to the river being identified by the end of the 20th century as the primary source of Narragansett Bay pollution.

In August 1955, severe flooding on the Blackstone caused extensive damage to Woonsocket, Rhode Island. Where the river is usually 70 feet (21 m) wide it swelled to over 1 mile (1.6 km) wide.

The river, together with the Woonasquatucket River to the south, was designated an American Heritage River in 1998.

Course
The river is formed in Worcester, Massachusetts by the confluence of the Middle River and Mill Brook. From there, it follows a rough southeast course through Millbury, Sutton, Grafton, Northbridge, Uxbridge, Millville, and Blackstone. It then continues into Rhode Island, where it flows through Woonsocket, Cumberland, Lincoln, Central Falls, and Pawtucket, where the river then reaches Pawtucket Falls. After that, the river becomes tidal, and flows into the Seekonk River just north of Providence. Other tributaries join the Blackstone along the way, such as the West and Mumford River, at Uxbridge, and the Branch River in North Smithfield.

Pollution and remediation efforts
The Blackstone River has a long association with industry, and a legacy of pollution as a result. By 1900 the river was already considered polluted and the Massachusetts Department of Public Health said in a report, "The Department finds that the condition of the Blackstone River is offensive throughout its course, from Worcester to the state line at Blackstone.  The condition of the stream is likely to grow worse until effective measures are completed for removing from the river much of the pollution which it now receives." In 1965, the Water Resources Planning Act created the Water Resources Council Commission and seven river basin commissions.  Earth Day 1970 made an impact across the nation. There were ecology group leaders in the Blackstone River Valley already organized and were springing into action in their local areas.  By 1971, a formalized plea for action to the Governor of Rhode Island was made in writing and subsequently in an historic meeting at Old Slater Mill in December 1971. Political support was pledged and in the next few months, the plan discussed that day was followed through by one of the leading organizations, BRWA, that was unique because it served communities from Worcester, MA to Providence, RI along the entirety of the river from the headwaters down to the Narragansett Bay. The executive director of the Blackstone River Watershed Association was David M. Rosser. In April 1972 momentum was building and support was increasingly widespread.  What was urgently needed at that time in Spring 1972 was a bullhorn to increase public awareness of the plan for a massive river cleanup. The Providence Journal promotions director, Leighton Authier, was all in after he read through Rosser's very clear and specific action plan.  It was not only a plan for the here and now in summer of 1972, but it was a vision for the future of the Blackstone River.  That moment in time is known as "Operation ZAP" or also known as "Project ZAP" which was what the newspaper called it.  You can see the story of what was ZAP Day on September 9, 1972, in a documentary film entitled, "Operation ZAP" produced in 1974 by a Boston University professor of communications. Today people say, "Zap the Blackstone," and that is harkening back to what happened- what was begun - back on ZAP Day. That was the beginning of a culture shift in the Blackstone Valley when the communities interested, organized, and resolved to cleanup the their river. Congressman St Germain is known to have said and it's documented in the Congressional Record, "ZAP is an example for the nation." Soon after ZAP, the 1972 Clean Water Act (CWA) sealed the fate of industrial river polluters who had been polluting, abusing, and neglecting this river since 1791.  The CWA supported this eagerness in the community to keep up the good work to clean up the river and to hold accountable the industrial culprits, including municipalities who had not yet created sufficient sewerage  infrastructure.  In 1990, the United States Environmental Protection Agency called the Blackstone, "The most polluted river in the country with respect to toxic sediments."

Early industries discharged a variety of pollutants into the river including dyes from textile mills and heavy metals and solvents from metal and woodworking industries. Much of this early pollution lies trapped in sediments behind historic dams on the river and continues to affect the ecosystem today. Much recent pollution can be traced to the Upper Blackstone Water Pollution Abatement District (UBWPAD), the wastewater treatment plant for Worcester, Massachusetts and surrounding communities, which discharges into the Blackstone. A 2005 report written by the Rhode Island Department of Environmental Management said, "...[the] UBWPAD, North Attleboro, and Attleboro WWTFs play a significant role in the ability to improve water quality in the Providence and Seekonk River system [into which the Blackstone discharges], and efforts to reduce their nitrogen inputs should be initiated as soon as possible." In September 2010, the Conservation Law Foundation, citing this report, filed a lawsuit claiming that the discharge permit issued to the UBWPAD by the Environmental Protection Agency is not "sufficient to meet state water quality standards".

River cleanup is still underway, and today the Blackstone is considered a Class C river (suitable only for "secondary contact" activities like boating) for much of its length.

Crossings

Below is a list of all crossings over the Blackstone River. The list starts at the headwaters and goes downstream.

Worcester
Millbury Street
Massachusetts State Route 122A/146 (Twice)
Millbury
Southwest Cutoff (U.S. 20)
Access Road
Interstate 90
Main Street
Massachusetts State Route 146
MA 146 Ramp to Main Street
Waters Street
Elm Street
South Main Street
Providence Street (MA 122A) 
Riverlin Street
Sutton
Blackstone Street
Depot Street
Grafton
Pleasant Street
Main Street (MA 122A)
Depot Street
Northbridge
Sutton Street
Providence Road (MA 122)
Elston Avenue
Church Street Extension
Uxbridge
East Hartford Avenue
Mendon Street (MA 16)
Millville Road (MA 122)
Millville
Central Street
Cam's Street
Blackstone
Bridge Street
St. Paul Street
Woonsocket
Singleton Street
River Street
Fairmount Street
Sayles Street
South Main Street (RI 104)
Bernon Street
Court Street (RI 122)
Hamlet Avenue (RI 122/126)
Rhode Island State Route 99
Cumberland
Manville Hill Road
School Street
Interstate 295
George Washington Highway (RI 116)
Blackstone River Bikeway
Martin Street
Lonsdale Avenue (RI 122)
John Street (RI 123)
Central Falls
Broad Street (RI 114)
Roosevelt Avenue
Cross Street
Pawtucket
Exchange Street (RI 15/114 Southbound)

Tributaries
In addition to many unnamed tributaries, the following brooks and rivers feed the Blackstone:

Worcester Aqueduct
Dorothy Brook
Cronin Brook
Quinsigamond River
Mumford River
West River
Still Corner Brook
Emerson Brook
Bacon Brook
Aldrich Brook
Ironstone Brook
Branch River
Fox Brook
Cherry Brook
Mill River
Peters River
Crookfall Brook
West Sneech Brook
Monastery Brook
Abbott Run

See also
Blackstone River Valley National Historical Park
Blackstone River and Canal Heritage State Park
Blackstone Valley
List of rivers in Massachusetts
List of rivers in Rhode Island
Seekonk River
Ten Mile River (Seekonk River)
Woonasquatucket River
William Blaxton

Citations

General references
Maps from the United States Geological Survey

External links

Providence Journal video of the Blackstone River
Various Views Along the Blackstone River
YouTube video of various still photos from the 1955 flood

American Heritage Rivers
Blackstone River Valley National Historical Park
Narragansett Bay
Rivers of Providence County, Rhode Island
Rivers of Worcester County, Massachusetts
Tributaries of Providence River